Joaquim  is the Portuguese and Catalan version of Joachim and may refer to:

 Alberto Joaquim Chipande, politician
 Eduardo Joaquim Mulémbwè, politician
 Joaquim Agostinho (1943–1984), Portuguese professional bicycle racer
 Joaquim Amat-Piniella (1913–1974), Catalan writer and politician
 Joaquim Antonio (Callado) da Silva (1848–1880), Brazilian composer and flutist
 Joaquim António de Aguiar (1792–1884), Portuguese politician
 Joaquim Arcoverde de Albuquerque Cavalcanti (1850–1930), first Cardinal to be born in Latin America
 Joaquim Augusto Mouzinho de Albuquerque (1855–1902), Portuguese soldier
 Joaquim Benedito Barbosa Gomes, first black Supreme Federal Tribunal justice in Brazil
 Joaquim Carvalho (born 1937), Portuguese football goalkeeper
 Joaquim Chissano (born 1939), President of Mozambique
 Joaquim Cruz (born 1963), former Brazilian athlete
 Joaquim de Almeida (born 1957), Portuguese actor
 Joaquim de Magalhães Fernandes Barreiros (Quim Barreiros) (born 1947), Portuguese musician 
 Joaquim Ferraz (born 1974), Portuguese footballer
 Joaquim Floriano de Godoy (1826–1907), Brazilian doctor and politician
 Joaquim Gomes (born 1980), Angolan professional basketball player
 Joaquim Gomes (cyclist), Portuguese road bicycle racer
 Joaquim Goes, Indian scientist
 Joaquim Guedes (born 1932), Brazilian architect
 Joaquim José Antunes (1731–1811), Portuguese harpsichord maker
 Joaquim Leitão (born 1956), Portuguese film director
 Joaquim Machado de Castro (1731–1822), one of Portugal's foremost sculptors
 Joaquim Magalhães Mota (born 1947), Portuguese politician
 Joaquim Manuel de Macedo (1820–1882), Brazilian author
 Joaquim Maria Machado de Assis (1839–1908), Brazilian realist novelist, poet and short-story writer
 Joaquim Miranda (1950–2006), Portuguese economist and politician
 Joaquim Nabuco (1849–1910), Brazilian writer and statesman
 Joaquim Nadal (born 1948), spokesperson of the Catalan Government
 Joaquim Pedro de Andrade (1932–1988), Brazilian film director and screenwriter
 Joaquim Pedro de Oliveira Martins (1845–1894), Portuguese writer
 Joaquim Pimenta de Castro (1846–1918), Portuguese military officer and politician
 Joaquim Pinheiro (born 1960), retired Portuguese runner
 Joaquim Rafael Branco (born 1953), São Toméan politician
 Joaquim Rodríguez Spanish Cyclist
 Joaquim Santana, Portuguese footballer
 Joaquim Sapinho (born 1965), Portuguese film director
 Joaquim Silva (athlete) (born 1961), Portuguese long-distance runner
 Joaquim Videira (born 1984), Portuguese épée fencer
 Marcos Joaquim dos Santos (born 1975), Brazilian central defender
 Tobias Joaquim Dai (born 1950), Minister of National Defence of Mozambique
 Vasco Joaquim Rocha Vieira (born 1939), Portuguese administrator and army officer

See also
 Joaquim (film), a 2017 Brazilian film

Catalan masculine given names
Portuguese masculine given names